Hermida is a surname, and may refer to:

Hugo Campos Hermida (1928–2001), Uruguayan police officer
Jeremy Hermida (born 1984), American baseball player
José Antonio Hermida  (born 1978), Spanish cyclist
Alfred Hermida  (born 1965), British digital media scholar

Hermida is the 3081 most common surname in Spain.

The surname Hermida is ranked 35,605 out of 88,799 in the United States.

References